This is a list of schools within Houston. Almost all of the city is in Harris County but some parts are in Fort Bend County and Montgomery County.

Public schools
This is a list of school districts which cover sections of the Houston city limits.
 Houston ISD (See the list of schools)
 Aldine ISD
 Alief ISD
 Clear Creek ISD
 Conroe ISD
 Crosby ISD
 Cypress-Fairbanks ISD
 Galena Park ISD
 Humble ISD
 Klein ISD
 New Caney ISD
 Pasadena ISD
 Sheldon ISD
 Spring ISD
 Spring Branch ISD
 Defunct
 North Forest ISD

Individual district-operated schools
Note that there are portions of Houston zoned to schools outside of the city limits, and vice versa.

Each of these school districts has or had (in the case of North Forest) a majority of its territory in the Houston city limits, so consult the district pages for lists of their schools:
 All Houston ISD schools except Bellaire High School, Pin Oak Middle School (Bellaire), West University Elementary School (West University Place), Condit Elementary School (Bellaire), and Horn Elementary School (Bellaire) are in the city limits of Houston. Formerly Gordon Elementary School and Mandarin Immersion Magnet School were in the Bellaire city limits. See: List of Houston Independent School District schools
 Most Alief ISD schools are in the city of Houston; those in unincorporated areas include Alief Taylor High School, Jack Albright Middle School, O'Donnell Middle School, Judith G. Miller Intermediate School, Charlette Taylor Hearne Elementary School, Howard J. Hicks Elementary School, David Kent Holmquist Elementary School, Willard L. Petrosky Elementary School, and Flem Rees Elementary School
 All Spring Branch ISD schools except Memorial High School (Hedwig Village), Spring Branch Middle School (Hedwig Village), Bunker Hill Elementary School (Bunker Hill Village), Frostwood Elementary School (Bunker Hill Village), Hunters Creek Elementary School (Hunters Creek Village), and Memorial Drive Elementary School (Piney Point Village) are in the city limits of Houston
 North Forest ISD (closed 2013) had its schools in the Houston city limits

The following are of school districts with some territory in Houston:
Only schools in the Houston city limits are listed here; schools physically located in unincorporated areas or other municipalities which have "Houston, Texas" United States Postal Service addresses are not listed here.
 Aldine Independent School District
 Aldine Senior High School
 Carver High School
 Eisenhower Senior High School
 Victory Early College High School
 Aldine Ninth Grade School
 Dunn Elementary School
 Eisenhower Ninth Grade School
 Hoffman Middle School
 Thomas J. Stovall Middle School 
 Anderson Academy
 Mary M. Bethune Academy
 Caraway Elementary School
 Ermel Elementary School 
 Goodman Elementary School (formerly Hidden Valley Elementary School)
 Harris Academy
 Marcella Elementary School
 Smith Academy
 Stovall Academy
 Thompson Elementary School 
 Reece Pre-K – K Academy
 Vines EC/PK & Head Start Center
 Clear Creek Independent School District
 Clear Lake High School
 Clear Lake Intermediate School
 Space Center Intermediate School
 Armand Bayou Elementary School
 Clear Lake City Elementary School
 Falcon Pass Elementary School
 North Pointe Elementary School
 John F. Ward Elementary School
 G. H. Whitcomb Elementary School
 Cypress Fairbanks Independent School District
 Berta Dean Middle School
 Bane Elementary School
 Lillie Holbrook Elementary School
 Fort Bend Independent School District
 Willowridge High School
 Christa McAuliffe Middle School
 Blue Ridge Elementary School
 Briargate Elementary School
 Ridgegate Elementary School - Construction began in 1979 and it opened in January 1981
 Ridgemont Elementary School
 Galena Park Independent School District
 Woodland Acres Middle School
 Cimarron Elementary School
 Pyburn Elementary School
 Woodland Acres Elementary School - Opened in the 1950s and occupied its current building in August 2018.  it had about 400 students
 Humble Independent School District (includes Kingwood)
 Kingwood High School (Kingwood)
 Kingwood Park High School (Kingwood)
 Atascocita Middle School (within the limited purpose city limits)
 Creekwood Middle School (Kingwood)
 Kingwood Middle School (Kingwood)
 Riverwood Middle School (Kingwood)
 Bear Branch Elementary School (Kingwood)
 Deerwood Elementary School (Kingwood)
 Elm Grove Elementary School (Kingwood)
 Foster Elementary School (Kingwood)
 Lakeshore Elementary School (within the limited purpose city limits)
 Maplebrook Elementary School (within the limited purpose city limits)
 Shadow Forest Elementary School (Kingwood)
 Summerwood Elementary School (within the limited purpose city limits)
 Willow Creek Elementary School (Kingwood)
 Woodland Hills Elementary School (Kingwood)
 Katy Independent School District
 Maurice L. Wolfe Elementary School
 Pasadena Independent School District
 Dobie High School
 Beverly Hills Intermediate School
 Thompson Intermediate School
 Earnesteen Milstead Middle School
 Morris Middle School (formerly Morris Fifth Grade Center)
 Rick Schneider Middle School
 Atkinson Elementary School
 John H. Burnett Elementary School
 Laura Welch Bush Elementary School
 Robert Bevis Frazier Elementary School
 A.B. Freeman Elementary School
 Garfield Elementary School
 Genoa Elementary School
 Charles D. Jessup Elementary School
 Meador Elementary School
 Richard H. Moore Elementary School
 Stuchbery Elementary School

County-operated schools
In addition the Harris County Department of Education, which is not classified as a school district under Texas law, operates HCDE Academic and Behavior Schools with two campuses in Houston, East and West. They were previously known as Adaptive Behavior Centers (ABC).  all school districts in the county may send students to these schools.

State-chartered charter schools

 Charter school organizations
 Harmony Public Schools
 KIPP Texas Public Schools
 The Varnett Public School
 YES Prep Public Schools
 Individual schools
 Amigos Por Vida Friends For Life Charter School
 Juan B. Galaviz Charter School
 Houston Heights High School
 George I. Sanchez Charter Schools
 SER-Niños Charter School
 Yes Prep Northline
 Raul Yzaguirre School for Success
 Defunct
 Benji's Special Educational Academy (merged into Victory Prep)
 Girls and Boys Preparatory Academy
 High School for Business and Economic Success, became an HISD charter named Leader's Academy High School for Business and Academic Success in 2007 and later merged into Victory Prep
 Medical Center Charter School, a pre-kindergarten through 5th grade charter school, was located in the Westbury area. Despite its name, the school was not located in the Texas Medical Center area. Medical Center Charter School opened in 1996, and catered to employees working in the Medical Center and had the Montessori method, used until grade two. Its specialty as of 2003 was foreign languages. In 2014, the Texas Education Agency (TEA) announced that the school's performance was insufficient and that it sought to revoke its charter. By 2018, its charter had closed.
 University of Houston Charter School
 Victory Preparatory Academy (became an HISD charter in 2016, closed in 2018)

Private schools

Secular private schools
 Awty International School (French School of Houston)
 The Briarwood School
 Lycée International de Houston - Designated as a French overseas school by the AEFE.
 Memorial Private High School
 The Monarch School
 The Parish School
 The Post Oak School (has one campus in Houston)
 The Rainard School
 School of the Woods (partially in Houston)
 St. John's School
 Houston Sudbury School
 The Tenney School
 The Village School
 Robindell Private School (Kindergarten and grade 1) - In Gulfton
 Trafton Academy (K-8) - In Willowbend, Opened in 1973
 Melinda Webb School (infants to 7 years old) - Located in the Texas Medical Center, it is operated by the Center for Hearing and Speech and was previously at 3636 W. Dallas. The school serves as a day school for children not yet mainstreamed into regular classrooms and a speech and therapy center for those that are. Previously known as the Houston School for Deaf Children, it was given its current name, after a deaf girl, in 1997. The girl died of leukemia circa 1958; a former student of the school, she had been the first area deaf child to be mainstreamed into a public school, as she began attending one in Texas City in 1954. Her father, Frank Webb, donated $1 million to what became the Melinda Webb School in 2002. That year its enrollment was 35–40. In 2020 it began admitting preschool students without hearing difficulties to provide a more mainstream environment.

 Schools formerly in the Houston city limits which have since moved outside of the city limits
 British International School of Houston (now in unincorporated Harris County)
 The Kinkaid School (now in Piney Point Village)

Religious private schools

 Roman Catholic
 Cristo Rey Jesuit College Preparatory of Houston
 Incarnate Word Academy (Girls only)
 Saint Agnes Academy (Girls only)
 St. Pius X High School
 St. Thomas High School (Boys only)
 Strake Jesuit College Preparatory (Boys only)
 John Paul II Catholic School
 Our Lady of Guadalupe School
 The Regis School of the Sacred Heart (boys only)
 Protestant Christian
 Christian Life Center Academy
 Concordia Lutheran High School
 The Covenant Preparatory School
 Highlands Latin School, a private K-12 Christian School, is in Meyerland Section 3. The campus previously housed Pilgrim Lutheran School, a private K-8 Christian School, which later closed its K-8 section and now only has early childhood.
 Lutheran High School North (Texas)
 Lutheran South Academy
 Second Baptist School
 St. Francis Episcopal School (one campus is in Houston)
 St. Stephen's Episcopal School
 St. Thomas Episcopal School
 Westbury Christian School
 Yellowstone Academy
 St. Nicholas School (K-8) is an Anglican school. In 1987 the school was established, and in 1993 it opened the Saint Nicholas School II campus in the Texas Medical Center.  residents of apartment complexes make up about 25% of the parents of the students, and the school rents from Bethany United Methodist Church. It will later occupy a new development on a  property along South Main Street, in the 5 Corners District.
 Greek Orthodox
 Annunciation Orthodox School
 Jewish
 Robert M. Beren Academy
 The Emery/Weiner School
 Torah Day School of Houston
 Beth Yeshurun Day School
 Shlenker School
 Muslim
 Al-Hadi School of Accelerative Learning
 Iman Academy
 Islamic Education Institute of Texas (Darul Arqam Schools) - the Spring Branch campus, Southeast Campus, and Southwest Campus, all K-8 schools, are in the Houston city limits Its high school in north Harris County is outside of the city limits.
 Defunct
 Mount Carmel High School
 North Houston Baptist School
 Pilgrim Lutheran School (K-8), in Meyerland, Houston It now only has early childhood as its K-8 section closed, with Highlands Latin School occupying the space.

See also

 Education in Houston
 List of schools in Harris County, Texas
 List of state-chartered charter schools in Greater Houston

References

 
Houston